Princess Lelang (fl. 411) was a princess of the Northern Yan dynasty and a consort of the Yujiulü Hulü (Aikugai Khagan) of the Rouran Khaganate. She was the daughter of Feng Ba (Emperor Wencheng of Northern Yan).

In 411 Yujiulü Hulü, offered a tribute of 3,000 horses to Feng Ba and requested to marry Feng Ba's daughter Princess Lelang. Feng Ba, believing that an alliance with Rouran would be beneficial to his state, gave Princess Lelang in marriage to him.

References

Sources
 Book of Jin, Volume 125, Record 25, Feng Ba (Feng Sufu).

Rouran
Place of birth missing
5th-century Chinese women
5th-century Chinese people
Chinese princesses